There are several schools named River Oaks Elementary School
 River Oaks Elementary School (Houston), Texas
 River Oaks Elementary School, part of Pflugerville Independent School District in Austin, Texas
 River Oaks Elementary School, part of Galt Joint Union Elementary School District in Galt, California
 River Oaks Elementary School, part of Dearborn Public Schools in Dearborn Heights, Michigan
 River Oaks Elementary School, part of Prince William County Public Schools in the Woodbridge CDP of Prince William County, Virginia